Mowden is a hamlet in the civil parish of Hatfield Peverel, in the Braintree district, in the county of Essex, England. It is about 5 miles away from the city of Chelmsford and about 1 and a half miles away from the large villages of Boreham and Hatfield Peverel. It is also about a mile away from the main A12 road. There is also the hamlet of Nounsley nearby.

References
A-Z Essex, 2010 edition. p. 24.

Hamlets in Essex
Hatfield Peverel